Evangeline Louise Ancheta Pascual (born November 30, 1956) is a Filipino actress, artist, radio host and beauty queen who won Miss Republic of the Philippines 1973 and represented Philippines at Miss World 1973 where she placed first runner-up.

Career
In 1973, the 23rd annual Miss World pageant was held at the Royal Albert Hall in England. Fifty four delegates vied for the crown, with Miss United States Marjorie Wallace emerging as the winner and 16-year-old Pascual as first runner-up. However, Wallace had to be fired from her duties as Miss World; pageant organizers extended an offer to Pascual to carry out the duties of Miss World for the remainder of the year without being officially granted the title; Pascual had already signed a movie contract and turned down the Miss World offer, which was then accepted by second runner-up Miss Jamaica Patsy Yuen.

She did movies at age 18, playing lead roles with Fernando Poe, Jr. in Ang Pangalan: Mediavillo (1974), and Ramon Zamora in The Game Of Death (1974) and The Dragon Force Connection (1974). She starred also in Mission: Get The Mastermind (1975) with Roberto Gonzales, The Exit (1975) with Tony Ferrer, and Golden Chaku with Rey Malonzo.

Pascual played as the mother of Valeria played by Sheryl Cruz in GMA-7's TV series Bakekang (2006) starring Sunshine Dizon. And she played as the wife of Juan Rodrigo, and the mother of Matteo Guidicelli in Paraiso (2012) of ABS-CBN.

She hosts a long-running radio show on DWIZ 882 called Echoes of the Heart, where she does radio counselling on the matters of love and life. She is also an artist, her paintings became part of exhibits and were sold both in the Philippines and abroad.

Personal life
Pascual was Miss Republic of the Philippines 1973 from Orani, Bataan, Philippines. Her father was the late Dr. Francisco Pascual, Jr. She studied in University of Santo Tomas. She is the mother of Nino Lapid, a tattoo artist.

Selected filmography

Miss World 1973 (1973)
Ang Pangalan: Mediavillo (1974)
The Exit (1975)
Golden Chaku (1977)
Noel Juico: Batang Kriminal (1991)
Judge Asuncion: Hukom Bitay (1995)
Love Notes (1995)
Maruja (1996) 
Bayarang Puso (1996)
DoReMi (1996)
Si Mokong, Astig at si Gamol (1997)
Sanggano (1997)
April, May, June (1998)
Sisa (1999)
Pangako sa 'Yo (2000)
Umulan Man o Umaraw (TV series) (2000)
Maalaala Mo Kaya – Lobo (2001)
Basta't Kasama Kita (TV series) (2002)
Two Timer (2002)
Lastikman (2003)
Inter.m@tes (2004)
Magpakailanman – "The Manny and Pie Calayan Story" (2005)
La Visa Loca (2005)
Calla Lily (2006)
Bakekang (TV series) (2006)
Maalaala Mo Kaya – "Barko" (2007)
Daisy Siete: "Tabachingching" (2007)
Ysabella (TV series) (2007)
Banal (2008)
Pieta (2008)
T2 (2009)
May Bukas Pa (2009–2010)
Beauty Queen (2010–2011)
Biritera (TV series) (2012)
Paraiso (2012–2013)
Hawak-Kamay (2014)
You're My Home (2015)
Sana Dalawa ang Puso (2018)

See also
Marjorie Wallace
Binibining Pilipinas
Miss Earth 2003
Philippines at major beauty pageants
Miss World Philippines
Mutya ng Pilipinas

References

External links

Evangeline Pascual 1973 Miss World (unofficial)

Living people
Filipino beauty pageant winners
Miss World 1973 delegates
Actresses from Bataan
University of Santo Tomas alumni
1956 births